The Lac des Alliés (English: Allied Lake) is a freshwater body crossed west by the Rocheuse River, located in the unorganized territory of Lac-Jacques-Cartier, in the La Côte-de-Beaupré Regional County Municipality, in administrative region of Capitale-Nationale, in province of Quebec, in Canada.

Lac des Alliés is located entirely in Jacques-Cartier National Park. It constitutes an enlargement of the Rocheuse River.

The Lac des Alliés watershed is mainly served on the east side by the route 175 which links the towns of Quebec and Saguenay. A few secondary roads serve this area for forestry and recreational tourism activities.

Forestry is the main economic activity in the sector; recreational tourism, second.

The surface of Lac des Alliés is generally frozen from the beginning of December to the end of March; safe circulation on the ice is generally done from the end of December to the beginning of March.

Geography 

It is the third largest of the 216 bodies of water in the Jacques-Cartier National Park.

Toponymy 
The name of this body of water would come from the surveyors evoking the memory of the allied troops of the First World War.

The toponym Lac des Alliés was formalized on December 5, 1968, by the Commission de toponymie du Québec.

See also 
 Jacques-Cartier National Park
 La Côte-de-Beaupré Regional County Municipality
 Lac-Jacques-Cartier, an unorganized territory
 Rocky River
 Rivière du Malin
 Jacques-Cartier River
 List of lakes of Canada

Notes and references

Bibliography 
.

Lakes of Capitale-Nationale
La Côte-de-Beaupré Regional County Municipality